Darine Fakhreddine (born 8 January 1981) is a Lebanese football coach and former player who is the goalkeeper coach of the Lebanon women's national under-17 team. She played as a goalkeeper for the Lebanon national team.

International career 
Fakhreddine has been capped for Lebanon at senior level, playing at the 2006 Arab Women's Championship, the 2010 Arabia Women's Cup, the 2011 WAFF Women's Championship, the 2014 AFC Women's Asian Cup qualification and the 2015 Aphrodite Women Cup.

See also
 List of Lebanon women's international footballers

References

1981 births
Living people
People from Chouf District
Lebanese women's footballers
Women's association football goalkeepers
Lebanon women's international footballers
Association football goalkeeping coaches